A bronze statue of Balto by Frederick Roth is installed in Central Park, Manhattan, New York. Balto (1919 – March 14, 1933) was a Siberian Husky and sled dog belonging to musher and breeder Leonhard Seppala. He achieved fame when he reportedly led a team of sled dogs on the final leg of the 1925 serum run to Nome, in which diphtheria antitoxin was transported from Anchorage, Alaska, to Nenana, Alaska, by train and then to Nome by dog sled to combat an outbreak of the disease.

Description and history
Located north of the Central Park Zoo near the intersection of East Drive and 67th Street, the sculpture was dedicated on December 17, 1925. Roth modeled the sculpture of Balto on a New Hampshire malamute named Chinook. A bas-relief rendering of the pivotal journey is carved into the pedestal. Balto himself was reportedly present at the ceremony. The statue is a popular attraction: children frequently climb the statue to pretend to ride on the dog. There is a plaque at the base of the statue, which reads:"Dedicated to the indomitable spirit of the sled dogs that relayed antitoxin six hundred miles over rough ice, across treacherous waters, through Arctic blizzards from Nenana to the relief of stricken Nome in the Winter of 1925. Endurance · Fidelity · Intelligence".

Legacy
The statue was used at the ending scene of the Universal Pictures animated film Balto.

See also

 1925 in art

References

External links
 

1925 establishments in New York City
1925 sculptures
Bronze sculptures in Central Park
Monuments and memorials in Manhattan
Outdoor sculptures in Manhattan
Dog monuments
Sculptures of dogs in the United States
Statues in New York City